"Take It Like a Man" is a song written by Tony Haselden, and recorded by Canadian country music artist Michelle Wright.  It was released in February 1992 as the first single from Wright's album Now and Then. The song became Wright's first Number One on the Canadian RPM Country Tracks charts that year. It was also her only top 10 hit on the Billboard Hot Country Singles & Tracks chart in the United States. Country singer Lari White is featured on background vocals.

The single and its music video, directed by Canadian director Steven Goldmann, went on to win Single of the Year and Video of the Year from the Canadian Country Music Association. The album that included the song won Album of the Year from the RPM Big Country Awards in 1993. The song's success in the United States won Wright Top New Female Vocalist from the Academy of Country Music in 1993.

Chart performance
In Canada, the song debuted at number 84 on the RPM Country Tracks on the chart dated March 28, 1992 and spent 11 weeks on the chart before peaking at number 1 on June 6, 1992.

Year-end charts

References

1992 singles
Michelle Wright songs
Arista Nashville singles
Music videos directed by Steven Goldmann
Songs written by Tony Haselden
1992 songs
Canadian Country Music Association Single of the Year singles
Canadian Country Music Association Video of the Year videos